is the third studio album by Japanese singer Kyary Pamyu Pamyu, officially released on July 9, 2014. The album's official title is a portmanteau of the words "fantasy" and "person" (jin), as officially referenced to the album covers. The songs "Slowmo", from single "Yume no Hajima Ring Ring", and "Scanty Skimpy", from single "Family Party", were not included in the final track listing. Rhino Entertainment/Warner released the Vinyl LP Picture Disc version on January 13, 2015 in the USA. "Kira Kira Killer" and "Koi Koi Koi" were used in the soundtrack for the 2016 motion picture Sing (but was not released on the Sing: Original Motion Picture Soundtrack).

Background
In September 2013, Kyary announced a second world tour titled Nanda Collection World Tour and a new single "Mottai Night Land" was released in late October and received positive reviews from Western media outlets. Mottai Night Land was released on November 6. The world tour visited the United States, Canada, Australia, England, France, Germany, Taiwan, Thailand, Singapore, Hong Kong, and Kyary's native Japan, lasting from February until June 2014. With her second world tour, Kyary continued to gain more international attention. In May, Dazed & Confused announced that Kyary was working with international musicians SOPHIE and Yelle on new upcoming music. Kyary announced at her ZEPP Tokyo concert that she will be releasing her 3rd full album titled  on July 9, 2014. The album was fully released on July 9, 2014 in digital download and the CD: in normal edition and Type A and B limited edition, were released a day after.

All her singles are featured on the new album except for the b-side songs "Slow Mo" and "Scanty Skimpy", which were omitted. The new song, "Ring a Bell" is Pamyu Pamyu's first full-length English song as well.

Reception

Pika Pika Fantajin received favorable reviews from music critics. Robert Lowe from Sputnikmusic gave it a three-and-a-half out of five. He said "Kyary Pamyu Pamyu's fourth release in four years Pikapika Fantajin has the sensational pop star rattling albums off like a Japanese version of The Smiths, but quantity does not always equal quality as Kyary's last two records show a glaring inconsistency in quality." He concluded saying "The six or so sing-along/dance friendly top notch J-pop songs however are strong enough to warrant replaying Pikapika Fantajin all summer long, as long as you're willing to skip tracks somewhat often." Patrick St. Michel from Pitchfork Media gave it a 6.7 out of 10. He said "Fantajin stumbles at times and ultimately feels like a transitional album, but its mix of new sonic twists and straight-up pop delicacies make for good listen overall, underscoring the fact that Kyary Pamyu Pamyu is more than a YouTube oddity. And more people are picking up on that: Kyary is currently working with wonky producer Sophie and French pop act Yelle on new music, an intriguing development in her still-young career." Maura Johnston of Spin gave the album a 7 out of 10 in her review.

Track listing

Personnel
Credits adapted from liner notes and AllMusic.

 capsule – primary artist
 Takeshi Hanzawa – photography
 Taku Hatao – retouching
 *Kumiko Iijima – stylist
 Tsuyoshi Ishii – producer
 Kei Ishizaka – executive producer
 Ayano Ishizaki – A&R
 Harumi Ito – A&R
 Kazu Kobayashi – executive producer
 Shinji Konishi – hair, make-up
 Yuri Kudo – staff
 Masayo Kuroda – production coordination
 Kyary Pamyu Pamyu – primary artist
 Tadashi Matsuyama – production coordination
 Keisuke Nagamine – prop design
 Yusuke Nakagawa – executive producer
 Steve Nakamura – art direction, designer
 Masahiro Nakawaki – supervisor
 Atsushi Suzuki – supervisor
 Shuji Utsumi – executive producer
 Yasutaka Nakata – arranger, engineer, mastering, mixing, primary artist, producer
 Keiko Yuyama – English translations

Charts

Oricon

References

External links

2014 albums
Albums produced by Yasutaka Nakata
Unborde albums
Kyary Pamyu Pamyu albums